Dag Gunnar Album (born 1948) is a Norwegian sociologist.

He graduated from the University of Oslo with a cand.sociol. degree in 1972, and took the dr.philos. degree in 1996. He then worked as a research assistant at the University of Tromsø and as a researcher at Statistics Norway. He then returned to the University of Oslo in 1997 to become professor.

Album was a member of the board of the Norwegian Institute for Social Research from 2005 to 2008, and was re-elected for the term 2009 to 2012.

Selected bibliography
 Nære fremmede, 1996.

References

 List of publications in FRIDA

1948 births
Living people
Norwegian sociologists
University of Oslo alumni
Academic staff of the University of Oslo
Academic staff of the University of Tromsø